Alberto Rey de Castro y Romaña (1 July 1869 – 18 May 1961) was a Peruvian politician and diplomat. He was Prime Minister of Peru, Minister of Justice and Minister of Foreign Relations in 1934.

Rey de Castro was born in Arequipa, Peru. His parents were Ezequiel Rey de Castro y Maria Manuela de Romaña y Bustamante. He received his early education in Lima at Colegio de la Inmaculada and Liceo Carolino and obtained his PhD from the University of San Agustin de Arequipa.

He joined the diplomatic service, serving as Secretary at Peru's legation in England (1902) and Chile (1905-1908), Chargé d'affairs in Argentina (1911-1914) and Plenipotentiary Minister in Ecuador (1916-1919). He was also appointed to Bolivia in 1920, but did not serve.

References

1869 births
1961 deaths
People from Arequipa
Peruvian diplomats
Foreign ministers of Peru
Peruvian people of Spanish descent
National University of Saint Augustine alumni